Southern Military District ( or Södra militärdistriktet) may refer to:

Southern Military District (Milo S), a military district from 1942 to 2000
Southern Military District (MD S), a military district from 2000 to 2005